Kati District (Wilaya ya Kati in Swahili)  is one of two administrative districts of Unguja South Region in Tanzania. The district is comparable in size to the land area of Guam. The district has a water border to the east and west by the Indian Ocean. The district is bordered to the north by Kaskazini B District of Unguja North Region. To the south Kati District is bordered by Kusini District. The district seat (capital) is the town of Tunguu. According to the 2012 census, the district has a total population of 76,346. The Zanzibar University is located in Tunguu and was founded in 2002.

Administrative subdivisions
As of 2012, Kati District was administratively divided into 11 wards.

Wards

 Bambi
 Chwaka
 Dunga
 Jumbi
 Kibojeu
 Koani

 Michamvi
 Ndijani
 Unguja Ukuu
 Uzi
 Uzini

References

Unguja South Region